Imrama is the debut album of the Irish black metal band Primordial. It was originally released in 1995. In 2001, it was re-issued by Hammerheart Records with two bonus tracks. It was reissued again, this time by Metal Blade Records in 2009 as CD/DVD digipack in slipcase. It is a part of collector series of the first 4 albums reissues.

Immrama, meaning 'voyages' or literally 'rowings about' refers to a category of medieval Irish Christian literature in which a protagonist sets about voyaging in penance for sins committed. Medieval catalogues of literature see this genre as contrasting with Eachtra, 'expeditions' or 'adventures' in which the protagonist visits the Otherworld of Irish traditional lore.

In Ireland, an overwhelmingly English speaking country, usage of the Irish language is an outward expression of Irish identity, which is a central theme of Primordial's aesthetic and appeal.

Track listing

Note: The "Dark Romanticism" demo tracks are part of the 2009 reissue

DVD
Live Cork City, Ireland, February 1994:
 Among the Lazarae
 Let the Sun Set on Life Forever
 To Enter Pagan
 The Darkest Flame
 The Fires

Credits
 Alan Averill - Vocals
 Ciáran MacUiliam - Guitars, Bodhrán, Tin-whistle, Keyboards
 Pól "Paul" MacAmlaigh - Bass
 Derek "D." MacAmlaigh - Drums, Percussion
 Andrew Radley - engineering, mixing
 Mags - mixing

Notes 

Primordial (band) albums
1995 debut albums
Cacophonous Records albums